This is a list of notable alumni of Shanghai Jiao Tong University (SJTU).

Government and politics

Natural sciences and mathematics 

Information science, system science and electrical engineering

Engineering and technological sciences 
 Chow Wen Tsing/Wen Tsing Chow (周文俊) - missile guidance scientist and digital computer pioneer
 Qian Xuesen (钱学森) - missile and space program chief scientist, Two-Bombs-One-Satellite medalist, National Exceptional Contribution Scientist awardee
 Xu Xueyan (许学彦) - famous ship designer
 Yang Jiachi (杨嘉墀) - space program scientist, specialist of automatic control, Two-Bombs-One-Satellite medalist
 Zhang Guangdou (张光斗) - world-renowned specialist in hydraulic engineering
 James S. C. Chao (趙錫成) - the founder of the Foremost Group, a New York-based shipping, trading, and finance enterprise.

Life sciences and medicine 
 Chen Zhu (陈竺) - hematologist, molecular biologist, and current minister of Ministry of Health
 Luc Montagnier (吕克·蒙塔尼耶) - Nobel Prize laureate for the discovery of HIV
 Wang Zhenyi/Zhen-yi Wang (王振义) - hematologist, State Preeminent Science and Technology Award winner

Humanities and social sciences 
 Cai Yuanpei (蔡元培) - famous educator, esperantist and the president of Peking University
 Hong Yi (李叔同) - master painter, musician, dramatist, calligrapher, seal cutter, poet, and Buddhist monk
 Lisa Lu (卢燕) - Chinese-American actress and documentary producer
 Mao Yushi (茅于轼) - economist
 Wu Youxun (吴有训) - educator

Business 
 Jiang Jianqing (姜建清) - president and chairman of the Industrial and Commercial Bank of China
 Mao Daolin (茅道临) - CEO of Sina
 Wang Shizhen (王世帧) - founder of China Merchants Bank
 Yang Yuanqing (杨元庆) - chairman of the Lenovo Group Limited
 Zhu Jun (朱骏) - founder of The9 Limited, chairman of football club Shanghai Shenhua F.C.
 Beini Da (达贝妮) - founder of SohoNow, chairman of Eurasian Science Village and Children's Museum China.
 Nanpeng Shen (沈南鹏) - founding managing partner, Sequoia Capital China

Sports 
 Ding Junhui (丁俊晖) - Professional snooker player
 Wang Liqin  (王励勤) - Professional table tennis player, World and Olympic multi medalist, once of best players in history
 Liu Guoliang (刘国梁) - Olympic gold medalist, chief manager of China's table tennis national team
 Yao Ming (姚明) - Professional basketball player
 Sui Lu (眭禄）- Olympic Silver Medalist gymnast

References